The 1889 Oamaru by-election was a by-election held on 30 September 1889 in the  electorate during the 10th New Zealand Parliament.

The by-election was caused by the resignation of the incumbent MP Thomas William Hislop. Hislop was returned as the MP. He was opposed by Mr D. Dunn.

Hislop's majority was reduced from 136 to 134 after two votes were removed. One person was charged with voting twice (personation).

Results
The following table gives the election result:

References

Oamaru 1889
1889 elections in New Zealand
Politics of Otago
September 1889 events